Andrei Silviu Margaritescu (born 1 January 1980) is a Romanian former footballer.

Club career
Andrei Mărgăritescu, nicknamed China was born in Pitești on 1 January 1980. He made his Divizia A debut at age 19 on 2 November 1999, playing for Rapid București under coach Mircea Lucescu in a 2–1 victory against FC Brașov. After taking a red card in a game against Steaua București, Mircea Lucescu gave him to wear the captain armband in the following game in order to make him more responsible and less aggressive in his play. After only one season at Rapid, Mărgăritescu went to play four seasons in Divizia B for Tractorul Brașov, Olimpia Satu Mare and Unirea Focşani, after which he was signed by Dinamo București, a team with who he managed to win the 2006–07 Liga I title, being used by coach Mircea Rednic in 31 games in which he scored one goal, also in the same season he helped the team reach sixteenths-finals of the UEFA Cup, playing 11 games in the campaign. In 2008, Mărgăritescu went to play alongside fellow Romanians Florentin Petre and Daniel Pancu in the Russian Premier League for Terek Grozny. He returned to Dinamo in 2009, where he would stay for one year and a half. In the 2011–12 season spent at Mioveni, he played his last Divizia A matches, a competition in which he has a total of 156 matches played and four goals scored, he also has a total 29 games played without scoring in European competitions. Mărgăritescu spent the last years of his career playing in the Romanian lower leagues at Mioveni, Atletic Bradu, Urban Titu and SCM Pitești.

International career
Andrei Mărgăritescu played three matches for Romania at the Euro 2008 qualifiers, under coach Victor Pițurcă. He made his debut when he came as a substitute and replaced Laurențiu Roșu in the 90th minute of a 2–0 away victory against Albania. His second game was a 2–0 away victory against Luxembourg and his final game was the second leg against Albania, a 6–1 home victory.

On 25 March 2008, he was decorated by the president of Romania, Traian Băsescu, for his performance in the UEFA Euro 2008 qualifying Group G, where Romania managed to qualify to UEFA Euro 2008 Group C. He received Medalia "Meritul Sportiv" – ("The Sportive Merit" Medal) class III.

Controversy
On 27 June 2014, Mărgăritescu received a three-year suspended sentence for buying a car while knowing it was stolen.

Honours
Dinamo București
Liga I: 2006–07
Cupa României: 2004–05
Supercupa României: 2005

References

External links

1980 births
Sportspeople from Pitești
Living people
Romanian footballers
Romania international footballers
FC Olimpia Satu Mare players
FC Rapid București players
CSM Focșani players
FC Dinamo București players
FC Akhmat Grozny players
CS Mioveni players
FC Argeș Pitești players
Expatriate footballers in Russia
Russian Premier League players
Liga I players
Liga II players
Association football midfielders